The 1955–56 season was the 8th season of competitive football in Israel and the 30th season under the Israeli Football Association, established in 1928, during the British Mandate.

Review and Events
 The league started with the completion of competitions started during the previous season including all league competitions and the state cup.
 At the end of the league season, the Israeli football league system was reorganized. At the top, a new league was formed, Liga Leumit, pushing the rest of the league down a tier. Liga Leumit was set to have 12 teams, down from 14 teams. At the end of the season, the bottom two teams were set to relegate to second-tier Liga Alef and the 11th and 12th placed team played a promotion/relegation play-offs with the two Liga Alef winners. In the second tier, the division was set to have 12 teams in one national division. Beneath that, Liga Bet was designated as third tier, with two regional divisions of 12 teams in each division. Liga Gimel was designated as fourth tier, divided to regional divisions. The new league structure entered a new season beginning in December 1956. The league season was completed by June 1956. At the end of the season, the top division was reduced to 10 clubs, with two clubs relegating to Liga Alef and the 10th placed team playing a promotion/relegation play-off against the top club in 1955–56 Liga Alef.
 On 14 September 1955, with a match between a Haifa XI and Tel Aviv XI, Kiryat Eliezer Stadium was officially opened.
 The national team participated in the 1956 Olympics qualification, playing against the USSR.

Domestic leagues

1954–55 Liga Alef
The league, which started during the previous season, was completed on 16 October 1955 and was won by Hapoel Petah Tikva, its first ever championship. At the bottom, Hapoel Hadera and Hapoel Balfouria relegated to 1955–56 Liga Alef. Beitar Jerusalem and Hapoel Kfar Saba finished 11th and 12th and faced 1954–55 Liga Bet regional divisions' winners, Hapoel Kiryat Haim and Maccabi Jaffa, at the end of which, Hapoel Kfar Saba retained its place in the top division, joined by Maccabi Jaffa.

Final table

Promotion/relegation play-offs

1955–56 Liga Leumit
The league started on 3 December 1955 and was played until 2 June 1956.  Maccabi Tel Aviv won the title, while Maccabi Rehovot and Hapoel Kfar Saba finished bottom and relegated to 1956–57 Liga Alef. Maccabi Jaffa, who finished 10th, played a promotion/relegation play-offs against Hakoah Tel Aviv, and won both matches to stay in the top division.

Final table

Promotion/relegation playoffs
The 10th-placed Maccabi Jaffa faced 1955–56 Liga Alef winner, Hakoah Tel Aviv. The matches took place on June 10 and 17, 1956.

Maccabi Jaffa won 4–1 on aggregate and remained in Liga Leumit. Hakoah Tel Aviv remained in Liga Alef.

Domestic cups

1954–55 Israel State Cup
The competition, which started on 22 January 1955, was played until autumn 1956, with the final being played on 19 November 1956. Maccabi Tel Aviv had beaten Hapoel Petah Tikva 3–1 in the final.

Final

1956–57 Israel State Cup
The competition started on 11 February 1956 and was completed during the next season.

Netanya 25th Anniversary Cup
In October and November, while the promotion playoffs and the State Cup were being played, two cup competitions were organized by Liga Leumit Clubs, the second edition of the Shapira Cup, and the Netanya 25th Anniversary Cup. The Shapira Cup, in which Hapoel Tel Aviv, Maccabi Tel Aviv, Maccabi Haifa and Hapoel Petah Tikva participated, was abandoned after two rounds of play.

Maccabi Netanya, Beitar Tel Aviv, Maccabi Petah Tikva and Hapoel Ramat Gan took part in a second cup competition, dedicated to the 25th anniversary of Netanya.

Table

National Teams

National team
After more than a year of inactivity, the national team was reorganized under a new coach, Jack Gibbons. The national team played several matches against local teams and visiting teams, travelled to the U.S. to play an American Soccer League XI in an Israeli Independence Day celebration and competed against the Soviet Union in the 1956 Olympics qualification.
The national team was also due to participate in the 1956 AFC Asian Cup qualification and was drawn to play Pakistan in the first round and Afghanistan in the second round. However, both teams declined playing Israel. As all the other teams in the western zone withdrew, the national team qualified as regional winner.

1956 Olympics qualification

1955–56 matches

International club matches

Visiting foreign teams

FK Sarajevo

Kapfenberger SV
In February 1956 the Israeli government lifted the ban on hosting teams from Austria and Hapoel and Maccabi Petah Tikva invited Kapfenberger SV to a tour of Israel. The visit was met with criticism from right-wing politicians and acts of sabotage in order to stop the Austrian team from playing, but the matches went ahead as planned.

Sunderland

Rampla Juniors

São Cristóvão

First Vienna

References

 
Seasons in Israeli football